The economy of Equatorial Guinea has traditionally been dependent on commodities such as cocoa and coffee, but is now heavily dependent on petroleum due to the discovery and exploitation of significant oil reserves in the 1980s. In 2017, it graduated from "Least Developed Country" status, the only Sub-Saharan African nation that managed to do so besides Botswana.

However, despite the economic growth and improving infrastructure, the country has been ranked only 138th out of 188 countries on the United Nations Human Development Index in 2015 and despite its impressive GNI figure, it is still plagued by extreme poverty because its Gini coefficient of 65.0 is the highest in the entire world . After the oil price collapsed in 2014, the economy went into a free fall which put growth in a downward spiral from around 15% to −10%.

Economy overview

Pre-independence Equatorial Guinea counted on cocoa production for hard currency earnings. In 1959 it had the highest per capita income of Africa which it still has, after several decades as one of the poorest countries in the world.

The discovery of large oil reserves in 1996 and their subsequent exploitation have contributed to a dramatic increase in government revenue. As of 2004, Equatorial Guinea was the third-largest oil producer in Sub-Saharan Africa.

Forestry, farming, and fishing are also major components of GDP. Subsistence farming predominates. Although pre-independence Equatorial Guinea counted on cocoa production for hard currency earnings, the neglect of the rural economy under successive regimes has diminished potential for agriculture-led growth. However, the government has stated its intention to reinvest some oil revenue into agriculture. A number of aid programs sponsored by the World Bank and the IMF have been cut off since 1993 because of corruption and mismanagement. No longer eligible for concessional financing because of large oil revenues, the government has been unsuccessfully trying to agree on a "shadow" fiscal management program with the World Bank and IMF. Businesses, for the most part, are owned by government officials and their family members. Undeveloped natural resources include titanium, iron ore, manganese, uranium, and alluvial gold (Mining in Equatorial Guinea). Growth remained strong in 2005 and 2006, led by oil.

In greater depth
Oil and gas exports have increased substantially and will drive the economy for years to come. Real GDP growth reached 23% in 1999, and initial estimates suggested growth of about 15% in 2001, according to IMF 2001 forecast. Per capita income grew from about $1,000 in 1998 to about $2,000 in 2000. The energy export sector is responsible for this rapid growth. There is ongoing additional development of existing commercially viable oil and gas deposits as well as new exploration in other offshore concessions.

Equatorial Guinea has other largely unexploited human and natural resources, including a tropical climate, fertile soils, rich expanses of water, deepwater ports, and an untapped, if unskilled, source of labor. Following independence in 1968, the country suffered under a repressive dictatorship for 11 years, which devastated the economy. The agricultural sector, which historically was known for cocoa of the highest quality, has never fully recovered. In 1969 Equatorial Guinea produced 36,161 tons of highly bid cocoa, but production dropped to 4,800 tons in 2000. Coffee production also dropped sharply during this period to bounce back to 100,000 metric tons in 2000. Timber is the main source of foreign exchange after oil, accounting for about 12.4% of total export earnings in 1996–99. Timber production increased steadily during the 1990s; wood exports reached a record 789,000 cubic meters in 1999 as demand in Asia (mainly China) gathered pace after the 1998 economic crisis. Most of the production (mainly Okoume) goes to exports, and only 3% is processed locally. Environmentalists fear that exploitation at this level is unsustainable and point out to the permanent damage already inflicted on the forestry reserves on Bioko.

Consumer price inflation has declined from the 38.8% experienced in 1994 following the CFA franc devaluation, to 7.8% in 1998, and 1.0% in 1999, according to BEAC data. Consumer prices rose about 6% in 2000, according to initial estimates, and there was anecdotal evidence that price inflation was accelerating in 2001.

Equatorial Guinea's policies, as defined by law, comprise an open investment regime. Qualitative restrictions on imports, non-tariff protection, and many import licensing requirements were lifted when in 1992 the government adopted a public investment program endorsed by the World Bank. The Government of the Republic of Equatorial Guinea has sold some state enterprises. It is attempting to create a more favourable investment climate, and its investment code contains numerous incentives for job creation, training, promotion of non-traditional exports, support of development projects and indigenous capital participation, freedom for repatriation of profits, exemption from certain taxes and capital, and other benefits. Trade regulations have been further liberalized since implementation in 1994 of the ICN turnover tax, in conformity with Central African tax and custom reform codes. The reform included elimination of quota restrictions and reductions in the range and amounts of tariffs. The CEMAC countries agreed to replace the ICN with a value added tax (VAT) in 1999.

While business laws promote a liberalized economy, the business climate remains difficult. Application of the laws remains selective. Corruption among officials is widespread, and many business deals are concluded under non-transparent circumstances.

There is little industry in the country, and the local market for industrial products is small. The government seeks to expand the role of free enterprise and to promote foreign investment but has had little success in creating an atmosphere conducive to investor interest.

The Equato-Guinean budget has grown enormously in the past 3 years as royalties and taxes on foreign company oil and gas production have provided new resources to a once poor government. The 2001 budget foresaw revenues of about 154 billion CFA francs (154 GCFAF) (about U.S.$200 million), up about 50% from 2000 levels. Oil revenues account for about two-thirds of government revenue, and VAT and trade taxes are the other large revenue sources.

Year 2001 government expenditures were planned to reach 158 billion CFA francs, up about 50% from 2000 levels. New investment projects represented about 40% of the budget, and personnel and internal and external debt payments represented about one-third of planned expenditures.

The Equato-Guinean Government has undertaken a number of reforms since 1991 to reduce its predominant role in the economy and promote private sector development. Its role is a diminishing one, although many government interactions with the private sector are at times capricious. Beginning in early 1997, the government initiated efforts to attract significant private sector involvement through a Corporate Council on Africa visit and numerous ministerial efforts. In 1998, the government privatized distribution of petroleum products. There are now Total and Mobil stations in the country. The government has expressed interest in privatizing the outmoded electricity utility. A French company operates cellular telephone service in cooperation with a state enterprise. The government is anxious for greater U.S. investment, and President Obiang visited the U.S. three times between 1999 and 2001 to encourage greater U.S. corporate interest. Investment in agriculture, fishing, livestock, and tourism are among sectors the government would like targeted.

Equatorial Guinea's balance-of-payments situation has improved substantially since the mid-1990s because of new oil and gas production and favorable world energy prices. Exports totaled about francs CFA 915 billion in 2000 (1.25 G$US), up from CFA 437 billion (700 M$US) in 1999. Crude oil exports accounted for more than 90% of export earnings in 2000. Timber exports, by contrast, represented only about 5% of export revenues in 2000. Additional oil production coming on line in 2001, combined with methanol gas exports from the new CMS-Nomeco plant, should increase export earnings substantially.

Imports into Equatorial Guinea also are growing very quickly. Imports totaled francs CFA 380 billion (530 M$US), up from franc CFA 261 million (420 M$US) in 1999. Imports of equipment used for the oil and gas sector accounted for about three-quarters of imports in 2000. Imports of capital equipment for public investment projects reached francs CFA 30 billion in 2000, up 40% from 1999 levels.

Equatorial Guinea's foreign debt stock was approximately francs CFA 69 billion (100 M$US) in 2000, slightly less than the debt stock in 1999, according to BEAC data. Equatorial Guinea's debt service ratio fell from 20% of GDP in 1994 to only 1% in 2000. Foreign exchange reserves were increasing slightly, although they were relatively low in terms of import coverage. According to the terms of the franc CFA zone, some of these reserves are kept in an account with the French Ministry of Finance.

Equatorial Guinea in the 1980s and 1990s received foreign assistance from numerous bilateral and multilateral donors, including European countries, the United States, and the World Bank. Many of these aid programs have ceased altogether or have diminished. Spain, France, and the European Union continue to provide some project assistance, as do China and Cuba. The government also has discussed working with World Bank assistance to develop government administrative capacity.

Equatorial Guinea operated under an IMF-negotiated Enhanced Structural Adjustment Facility (ESAF) until 1996. Since then, there have been no formal agreements or arrangements. The International monetary Fund held Article IV consultations (periodic country evaluations) in 1996, 1997, and in August 1999. After the 1999 consultations, IMF directors stressed the need for Equatorial Guinea to establish greater fiscal discipline, accountability, and more transparent management of public sector resources, especially energy sector revenue. IMF officials also have emphasized the need for economic data. In 1999, the Equato-Guinean Government began attempting to meet IMF-imposed requirements, maintaining contact with IMF and the World Bank representatives. However, the newfound oil wealth allowed the government to avoid improving fiscal discipline, transparency and accountability.

Infrastructure 

Infrastructure is generally old and in poor condition. , surface transport is extremely limited, with little more than 700 kilometres of paved roads. The African Development Bank is helping to improve the paved roads from Malabo to Luba and Riaba; the Chinese are undertaking a project to link Mongomo to Bata on the mainland, and the European Union is financing an inter-states road network linking Equatorial Guinea to Cameroon and Gabon. Road maintenance is often inadequate.

Electricity is available in Equatorial Guinea's larger towns thanks to three small overworked hydropower facilities and a number of aged generators. In 1999, national production was about 13 MWh. In Malabo, the American company, CMS-Nomeco, built a 10 megawatt electricity plant financed by the government, which came in line in mid-2000, and plans to double capacity are advancing. This plant provides improved service to the capital, although there are still occasional outages. On the mainland the largest city, Bata, still has regular blackouts.

Water is only available in the major towns and is not always reliable because of poor maintenance and mismanagement. Some villages and rural areas are equipped with generators and water pumps, usually owned by private individuals.

Parastatal Getesa, a joint venture with a minority ownership stake held by a French subsidiary of Orange, provides telephone service in the major cities. The regular system is overextended, but Orange has introduced a popular GSM system, which is generally reliable in Malabo and Bata.

Equatorial Guinea has two of the deepest Atlantic seaports of the region, including the main business and commercial port city of Bata. The ports of both Malabo and Bata are severely overextended and require extensive rehabilitation and reconditioning. The British company, Incat, has an ongoing project with the government to renovate and expand Luba, the country's third-largest port which is located on Bioko Island. The government hopes Luba will become a major transportation hub for offshore oil and gas companies operating in the Gulf of Guinea. Luba is located some 50 kilometres from Malabo and had been virtually inactive except for minor fishing activities and occasional use to ease congestion in Malabo. A new jetty is also being built at km 5 on the way from Malabo to the airport. It is a project mainly supposed to service the oil industry, but can also relieve the congested Malabo Port due to its closeness. The Oil Jetty at km 5 was supposed to open the end of March 2003. Riaba is the other port of any scale on Bioko but is less active. The continental ports of Mbini and Cogo have deteriorated as well and are now used primarily for timber activities.

There are both air and sea connections between the two cities of Malabo and Bata. As of 2002, a few aging Soviet-built aircraft constituted the national air fleet. Since then, most Soviet-built aircraft have been replaced by ATR and Boeing. The runway at Malabo (3,200 m) is equipped with lights and can service aircraft similar to Boeing 777s and Ilyushin Il-76s. The one at Bata (2,400 m) does not operate at night but can accommodate aircraft as large as Boeing 737s. Their primary users are the national airline (EGA) and a private company (GEASA). Two minor airstrips (800 m) are located at Mongomo and Annobon. There are international connections out of Malabo to Madrid and Zurich in Europe and to Cotonou, Douala and Libreville in West Africa.

Energy developments 

After a slow start, Equatorial Guinea has recently (as of 2002) emerged as a major oil producer in the Gulf of Guinea, one of the most promising hydrocarbon regions in the world. The main oil fields, Zafiro and Alba, both lie offshore of Bioko island. In 2002, production was nearly 200,000 barrels per day.

Production began in 1996. Progress was delayed due to a contractual dispute with the government and by unexpectedly difficult geology. The difference with the government was eventually resolved.

In 1998 a more liberal regulatory and profit-sharing arrangement for hydrocarbon exploration and production activities was introduced. It revised and updated the production-sharing contract, which, until then, had favoured Western operators heavily. As a result, domestic oil receipts rose from 13% to 20% of oil export revenue. However, the government's share remains relatively poor by international standards.

In 1997 CMS Nomeco moved to expand its operation with a U.S.$300m methanol plant. The plant entered production in 2000 and helped boost natural gas condensate output from Alba field.

In August 1999 the government closed bidding on a new petroleum-licensing round for 53 unexplored deepwater blocks and seven shallow-water blocks. The response was small due to a combination of factors, including falling oil prices, restructuring within the oil industry, and uncertainty over an undemarcated maritime border with Nigeria (which was not resolved until 2000).

In late 1999 Triton Energy, a U.S. independent, discovered La Ceiba in block G in an entirely new area offshore the mainland of the country. Triton expected a U.S.$200m development program to enable La Ceiba and associated fields to produce  by late 2001, despite disappointments and technical problems at the beginning of the year.

With an upturn in oil prices, exploration intensified in 2000. In April 2000 U.S.-based Vanco Energy signed a production-sharing contract for the offshore block of Corisco Deep. In May 2000, Chevron was granted block L, offshore Río Muni, and a further three production-sharing contracts (for blocks J, I, and H) were signed with Atlas Petroleum, a Nigerian company.

In early 2001 the government announced plans to establish a national oil company, to allow Equatorial Guinea to take a greater stake in the sector and to facilitate the more rapid transfer of skills. However, critics fear that such a company may become a vehicle for opaque accounting and inertia of the sort that has hindered development in neighbouring countries including Angola, Cameroon, and Nigeria.

Since 2001 the government has created GEPetrol, a national oil company; and Sonagas, a national natural-gas company. The company EG LNG has been created to construct and operate the Bioko Island LNG plant and terminal. The plant began to operate in May 2007 and a second plant is now under development.

Equatorial Guinea became a member of OPEC in May 2017.

Data 
The following table shows the main economic indicators in 1980–2017.

 Investment (gross fixed)
 46.3% (2005 est.)
 Industries
 Petroleum, fishing, sawmilling, natural gas
 Industrial production growth rate
 30% (2002 est.)
 Electricity – production
 29.43 GWh (2005)
 Electricity – consumption
 27.37 GWh (2005)
 Agriculture – products
 Coffee, cocoa, rice, yams, cassava (tapioca), bananas, palm oil nuts; livestock; timber
 Exchange rates
 Communauté financière africaine francs (CFAF) per US$1 – 480.56 (2005), 528.29 (2004), 581.2 (2003), 696.99 (2002), 733.04 (2001)

See also
 United Nations Economic Commission for Africa

See also
 Minister of Finance (Equatorial Guinea)
 United Nations Economic Commission for Africa

References

External links

Equatorial Guinea latest trade data on ITC Trade Map
Equatorial Oil- Government source on economics, run by the Ministry of Mines, Industry and Energy

 
Equatorial Guinea
Equatorial Guinea